Wesabe was a personal finance management website established in December 2005 that analyzed a user's financial data to provide appropriate advice on how to save money. The site went live in November 2006.

The company behind the website announced on 20 June 2007 that it had secured a US$4 million investment round to continue funding the website. Wesabe announced 30 June 2010 that it was shutting down service on 31 July 2010. Existing users were able to download and export their data, and use a forthcoming open source version of the site on their computer. 
New entrants are competing for the PFM market by supplying personal finance tools through employer HR departments.

References

Financial services companies established in 2005
Financial services companies disestablished in 2010
Finance websites
Internet properties established in 2005
Internet properties disestablished in 2010
Defunct online companies of the United States